Lake Hennessey is a reservoir in the Vaca Mountains, east of St. Helena and the Napa Valley, within Napa County, California.

The reservoir is formed by Conn Creek Dam, built in 1948 across Conn Creek.  Construction of the earthen dam was authorized by the United States Congress when it passed the Flood Control Act of 1944 in order to mitigate flooding downstream in Napa, California. 

Funding for the dam was never appropriated by Congress, so in 1946 the City of Napa took on the project and built it at a cost of $550,000 dollars plus $250,000 for the land. The cost of laying the  diameter pipeline from the dam to the city of Napa was $1.7 million. The 30 miles of pipe for the project was manufactured at the Basalt Rock Company plant located south of Napa. The design of the dam did not include a way to drain water from the reservoir when it comes close to full capacity. Once the lake is full, water drains from a spillway causing potential flooding dangers downstream. The reservoir and pipelines are maintained by the city of Napa, and it is its primary source of water. When the reservoir reaches its capacity, outflow reaches San Pablo Bay via Conn Creek to the Napa River. The lake was named after Edwin R. Hennessey. Hennessey was a local civic leader who played a role in the development of the Conn Valley reservoir.

Conn Creek Dam 
It is owned by the City of Napa.

See also 
 List of reservoirs and dams in California
 List of lakes in the San Francisco Bay Area

References 

Hennessey, Lake
Dams in California
Dams completed in 1948
United States local public utility dams
Napa, California
Vaca Mountains
Hennessey